Wat Buddhasamakeevanaram is a Thai Theravada Buddhist temple located in Bossier City, Louisiana. The temple belongs to the Dhammayuttika Nikaya order. It is the first Thai temple established in the state of Louisiana.

History
The temple was formed in 2003 to serve the religious needs of the Thai, Laotian and Vietnamese communities in the Shreveport-Bossier Area. It was incorporated in the state as a nonprofit religious corporation on November the following year.

External links
 Homepage (Primarily in Thai)

Asian-American culture in Louisiana
Thai-American culture
Thai Theravada Buddhist temples and monasteries
Overseas Thai Buddhist temples
Buddhist temples in Louisiana
2003 establishments in Louisiana
Buildings and structures in Bossier City, Louisiana